Bad Business is a detective novel by Robert B. Parker first published in 2004. It features Parker's most famous creation, Boston-based private investigator Spenser, and is the 31st novel in the series. In this novel, Spenser is hired by a wealthy woman to gather evidence on her husband's infidelity.  Soon, due to Spenser's investigation, homicides start occurring.

Plot summary
Spenser is hired by a wealthy woman, Marlene Rowley, to gather evidence on her husband's infidelity. While following the husband, Trent, one evening and finding him meeting his mistress, Spenser discovers that she too is being followed by another private detective. Things get even stranger when Spenser discovers that Marlene Rowley is also being followed by a third P.I.

Eventually, Trent winds up dead as Spenser is waiting to follow him outside his place of business, Kinergy, where he is CFO. The investigation picks up steam as Spenser tries to solve the murder. More people end up dead and the other two P.I.s Spenser ran into disappear. The story involves corporate corruption and an accounting scandal that only a detective as determined as Spenser can unravel.

Several Spenser-verse reappearing characters are featured in this book including Hawk, Vinnie Morris, Susan Silverman and Pearl, their dog.

External links
 Robert B. Parker's page on the book

2004 American novels
Spenser (novel series)
American detective novels